Central Pennsylvania Institute of Science & Technology is a regional vocational technical training school serving local public schools and adult learners. The school was established in 1969 by the Centre County public school districts. The School was formerly known as Centre County Vocational-Technical School. The school is governed by a board made up of school board directors from the four sending public school districts. The members are selected by the president of their respective school board and serve one year terms. The superintendent is from one of the sending districts and serves a one-year term on a rotating basis. In 2015, enrollment was 360 pupils. The complex is located in Pleasant Gap, within the Bellefonte Area School District's attendance region.

The member school districts are: Penns Valley Area School District, Bald Eagle Area School District and Bellefonte Area School District. In 2015, the majority of students (41%) came from Bald Eagle Area School District. Bellefonte Area School District students were 39% of enrolled pupils.

References

Vocational education in the United States
Centre County, Pennsylvania